"Trillionaire" is a song by American rapper Bun B. Hip-Hop artist T-Pain is featured on the track. The song served as the second single from his second album Trill O.G.. It is produced by J.U.S.T.I.C.E. League. The song
peaked at number 77 on the Hot R&B/Hip-Hop charts.

Remixes
A chopped and screwed version of the track appears on the chopped and screwed version of the Trill O.G. album. Another remix which became popular, but is not official, features the vocals of the song placed on the instrumental version of Bun B's song "Countin' Money". Southern rapper Lil Wyte did a freestyle for his mixtape Wyte Christmas II.

Music video
The video was shot and released in August 2010. The music video was shot in Houston, Texas and shows the various shots of the Houston skyline.

Chart performance

References

2010 singles
2010 songs
Bun B songs
T-Pain songs
Songs written by T-Pain
Song recordings produced by J.U.S.T.I.C.E. League
Songs written by Bun B
Songs written by Erik Ortiz
Songs written by Kevin Crowe